is a Japanese table tennis player. He is the younger brother of Maharu Yoshimura.

He was the singles winner of the 2018 Hong Kong Open.

References

1996 births
Living people
Sportspeople from Ibaraki Prefecture
Japanese people of Filipino descent
Japanese male table tennis players
Universiade medalists in table tennis
Universiade silver medalists for Japan
Okayama Rivets players
Medalists at the 2017 Summer Universiade
Aichi Institute of Technology alumni
21st-century Japanese people